Methagu is a 2021 Indian Tamil-language political thriller film based on the life of Velupillai Prabhakaran. The release of the film was postponed several times due to legal issues, but finally had the digital release through OTT platform 'BS Value' on 25 June 2021 with positive response.

The film is based on the early years of Velupillai Prabhakaran and the events in the life of Prabhakaran and his vision.

Cast 
 Kutti Manni as Velupillai Prabhakaran
 Eeshwar Baasha
 Vijay
 Aanandan
Vinoth Sagar
Rajasekar
Lizzie Antony as Sirimavo Bandaranaike
Rajavel Perumal as a street theatre artist
Velupillai – Raja
Mayor Duraiyappa – Aranganathan

Production 
Actor Kutti Manni was signed to play Prabhakaran, while Lizzie Antony played Sirimavo Bandaranaike, the former Prime Minister of Sri Lanka. Praveen Kumar and Ilanko were signed as composer and editor respectively, with Riyaz cranking the camera.

Release 
The film was expected to release on 26 November 2020, but due to the COVID-19 pandemic, it was postponed and finally it was released in 25 June 2021, through OTT platform 'BS Value'. The trailer to the film was released on 20 October, revealing it as a bio-pic of slain leader of the Liberation Tigers of Tamil Eelam (LTTE) and his supporters worldwide trended a Tamil hashtag #Methagu on Twitter. Film personalities Sathyaraj, Vetrimaaran, G. V. Prakash Kumar, Naveen and M. Sasikumar supported the film through their Twitter social media handle.

Reception 
A critic from Ananda Vikatan praised the film as a commendable effort, because it portrayed the transparent life of a freedom fighter, even though the film has factual error and lacks the budget. Film critic Baradwaj Rangan wrote that with all its faults, this is an important biopic about a very crucial figure not only in Sri Lankan politics, but also in Tamil Nadu politics. S.S.Lenin from Hindu Tamil Thisai wrote that even though the film lacks the budget, it portrayed the pain and life of Tamil Eelam people impactfully. Nasikethan of Dinamani wrote that the film has been enjoyed by people because, it portrayed truth.

Sequel 
Methagu 2 was released on 19 August 2022 on the OTT platform tamilsott.com.

References

External links 
 

2020s biographical films
2020s Tamil-language films
2021 films
2021 thriller films
Biographical films about revolutionaries
Cultural depictions of Sri Lankan people
Films postponed due to the COVID-19 pandemic
Indian political thriller films